Project Country (Spanish: Proyecto País) is a political party in Peru. 
At the last legislative elections, 8 April 2001, the party won 1.6% of the popular vote and no seats in the Congress of the Republic. Its presidential candidate at the elections of the same day, Marco Antonio Arrunátegui Cevallos, won 0.8% of the vote.

At the legislative elections held on  9 April 2006, the party won less than 1% of the popular vote and no seats in Congress.

Political parties in Peru
Political parties with year of establishment missing